Wazee Lake is a lake east of Black River Falls, Wisconsin, in the town of Brockway, Jackson County, Wisconsin, United States. The name "Wazee" means "tall pine" in the Ho-Chunk language. The man-made lake was formed after the site was used as a quarry for taconite mining between the mid-1960s through April 1983. The quarry produced about 850,000 tons of taconite pellets each year. The mine closed in 1983 as a result of a crash of the domestic steel markets in the United States. Once these pumps were shut down, the quarry began filling with water.

The lake is now part of a county park known as Wazee Lake Recreation Area. The lake is a prime scuba diving destination because of its deep, clear water. There are also visible remains of mining operations underwater, such as roadways used for hauling equipment. Some features have been added to the lake, such as underwater platforms for training divers and fish cribs to improve habitat for the fish. Fish species within the lake include rainbow, brook, and brown trout, bluegills, suckers, catfish, walleye, warmouth, and smallmouth bass.

References

"The Diver's Guide to Lake Wazee", John Janzen, Inland Sea Corp., 2004.

External links
Wazee Lake Recreation Area - Jackson County

Bodies of water of Jackson County, Wisconsin
Reservoirs in Wisconsin
Diving quarries
Protected areas of Jackson County, Wisconsin
Parks in Wisconsin